Human flesh search engine is a Chinese term for the phenomenon of distributed researching using Internet media such as blogs and forums. Internet media, namely dedicated websites and Internet forums, are in fact platforms that enable the broadcast of request and action plans concerning human flesh search and that allow the sharing of online and offline search results. Human flesh search has two eminent characteristics. First, it involves strong offline elements including information acquisition through offline channels and other types of offline activism. Second, it always relies on voluntary crowd sourcing: Web users gather together to share information, conduct investigations, and perform other actions concerning people or events of common interest.

Human flesh search engine is similar to the concept of "doxing." Both human flesh search engine and doxing have generally been stigmatized as being for the purpose of identifying and exposing individuals to public humiliation, sometimes out of vigilantism, nationalist or patriotic sentiments, or to break the Internet censorship in the People's Republic of China.  More recent analyses, however, have shown that it is also used for a number of other reasons, including exposing government corruption, identifying hit and run drivers, and exposing scientific fraud, as well as for more "entertainment"-related items such as identifying people seen in pictures. A categorization of hundreds of Human flesh search (HFS) episodes can be found in the 2010 IEEE Computer Society paper A Study of the Human Flesh Search Engine: Crowd-Powered Expansion of Online Knowledge.

The system is based on massive human collaboration. The name refers both to the use of knowledge contributed by human beings through social networking, and to the fact that the searches are usually dedicated to finding the identity of a human being who has committed some sort of offense or social breach online.  People conducting such research are commonly referred to collectively as "Human Flesh Search Engines".

Because of the convenient and efficient nature of information sharing in cyberspace, the human flesh search is often used to acquire information usually difficult or impossible to find by other conventional means (such as a library or web search engines).  Such information, once available, can be rapidly distributed to hundreds of websites, making it an extremely powerful mass medium.  The purposes of human flesh search vary from providing technical/professional Q&A support, to revealing private/classified information about specific individuals or organizations (therefore breaching the internet confidentiality and anonymity).  Because personal knowledge or unofficial (sometimes illegal) access are frequently depended upon to acquire this information, the reliability and accuracy of such searches often vary.

Etymology 
The term originated on the Mop forums in 2001, coined by Mop to describe "a search that was human-powered rather than computer-driven". The original human flesh search engine was a subforum on Mop similar to a question-and-answer (Q&A) site, focusing on entertainment-related questions. Gradually, the definition of the term evolved from not just a search by humans, but also a search of humans.

History 
An early human flesh search dated back to March 2006, when netizens on Tianya Club collaborated to identify an Internet celebrity named "Poison".  The man was found out to be a high-level government official.

However, Fei-Yue Wang et al. state that the earliest HFS search  was in 2001, "when a user posted a photo of a young woman on a Chinese online forum..., and claimed she was his girlfriend." She was eventually identified as a minor celebrity and the initial claim was discredited.

Over the years, the human flesh search was repeatedly deployed, sometimes fueling moral crusades against socially unacceptable behaviors, such as political corruption, extramarital affairs, animal cruelties or perceived betrayal/hostilities towards the Chinese nation.  Individuals on the receiving end often have their real-life identities or private information made public, and can be subjected to harassment such as hate mails/calls, death threats, graffiti and social humiliation.  Organizations can be subjected to coordinated cyber-attacks.

The human flesh search engine has also been deployed for amusement. Johan Lagerkvist, author of After the Internet, Before Democracy: Competing Norms in Chinese Media and Society, said that the Little Fatty meme, in which pictures of a teenager were photoshopped on film posters without the boy's permission, demonstrated that the human flesh search engine "can also be directed against society's subaltern and the powerless" and that "[t]his raises important issues of the legitimate right to privacy, defamation, and slander."

The Baojia system of community rule-of-law in ancient China bears strong similarities with human flesh search. Both are based on some form of vigilantism.

Stance of the People's Republic of China 
In December 2008, The People's Court in Beijing called it an alarming phenomenon because of its implications in "cyberviolence" and violations of privacy law.

On the one hand, human flesh search by netizens is a manifestation of freedom of speech. It is also the supervisory right given by Article 41 of the Chinese Constitution. On the other hand, human flesh search leads to the disclosure of ordinary people's names, identities, family addresses and other personal data. The Chinese government has an official stance on it – human flesh search engines violate privacy laws. 

Some local governments have made human flesh search engines illegal by stating that posting the private information of another will result in a fine of 5000RMB.

From March 1, 2020, the People’s Republic of China’s "Regulations on the Ecological Governance of Online Information Content" has been implemented, clarifying that users and producers of online information content services and platforms must not engage in online violence, doxing, deep forgery, data fraud, account manipulation and other Illegal activities

In film and television
Caught in the Web is a 2012 film by Chen Kaige which explores fictional instances of use of the human flesh search engine.
In the television series Mr. Robot, the mysterious group known as The Dark Army has elements based on the phenomenon.
Season 20 episode 6 of Law and Order was titled "Human Flesh Search Engine".
 A web-based platform designed to pool the knowledge efforts of Internet sleuths is the premise of the CBS program Wisdom of the Crowd.
 Searching is a 2018 American thriller film about human flesh search.
 The Snow White Murder Case presents a tragedy of human flesh search.
 The 2009 Chinese film Invisible Killer is related to human flesh search.
 Human Flesh Search Engine is a Chinese documentary released on 18 July 2009.

Notable examples 
South China Tiger photograph claims: In 2007, a hunter in Shaanxi Province, China, claimed to have encountered a live wild South China Tiger, which has long been considered extinct in natural environments. The photos he had taken were later published in a Science magazine (“Rare-Tiger Photo Flap Makes Fur Fly in China”). The wide circulation of these photos triggered a wave of authentication among Web users. who leveraged expertise in diverse domains ranging from zoology, botany, to photography and geometry. Finally, a participant successfully identified the origin of the images: a calendar cover painting, from which the hunter had used to forge the claimed South China Tiger pictures. Human flesh search ended up proving that the photos were fake and the 'exciting' discovery was a scam.
Zhang Ya's Earthquake Video: In May 2008, an earthquake with a magnitude of 8.0 swept through Sichuan, China, killing approximately 87,587 people. In response to the quake, a video insulting the victims was published on YouTube by an anonymous female user. After nationwide outrage, The Human Flesh Search Engine identified the girl as Zhang Ya, doxing her and uploading her personal information online.
Li Gang incident: On October 16, 2010, a drunk-driving student hit a pair of university students while driving inside Hebei University, with one fatality, and was reported to have shouted “Sue me if you dare, my dad is Li Gang!” when apprehended. Following the spread of the news on Chinese internet forums, the driver's identity was revealed as Li Qiming, the son of the deputy director of the local public security bureau.
Doxed driver in the west of China: On 21 March 2013, a driver in Ürümqi, China rolled down his window to spit on an elderly homeless person lying on the street. Witnesses recorded the first few digits of the license plate. A brief broadcast by a local radio quickly caused a stir on the Internet and the furious netizens doxxed Yin Feng, a part-time taxi driver in Ürümqi, only several hours later with harassing calls and blackmails.

See also

China brain
Doxxing
Hacktivism
Internet vigilantism
Mass collaboration
Outing
Streisand effect
Wisdom of the crowd

References

Further reading 
Cheong, P. H., & Gong, J. (2010) “Cyber vigilantism, transmedia collective intelligence, and civic participation”, Chinese Journal of Communication, 3(4), 471-487.
Lennon Y.C. Chang and Ryan Poon (2016) “Internet Vigilantism: Attitudes and Experiences of University Students in Hong Kong”, International Journal of Offender Therapy and Comparative criminology. (DOI: 10.1177/0306624X16639037)
Lennon Chang and Andy Leung (2015) “An introduction of cyber-crowdsourcing (human flesh searching) in the Greater China region” In Smith, R., Cheung, R and Lau, L. (eds) Cybercrime Risks and Responses: Eastern and Western Perspectives (pp, 240-252). NY: Palgrave. 
Bing Wang, Bonan Hou, Yiping Yao, Laibin Yan. Human Flesh Search Model Incorporating Network Expansion and GOSSIP with Feedback. 2009 13th IEEE/ACM International Symposium on Distributed Simulation and Real Time Applications (DS-RT 2009): 82-88.
 
 Capone, Vincent. The Human Flesh Search Engine: Democracy, Censorship, and Political Participation in Twenty-First Century China. ScholarWorks University of Massachusetts Boston. 2010.
 Levine, Jessi. . What Is a 'Human Flesh Search,' and How Is It Changing China? The Atlantic. 2012.

External links 
 'Human Flesh Search Engines’ Set Their Sights on Official Misbehavior Sky Canaves, The Wall Street Journal, December 29, 2008
 TVO's Search Engine podcast on The Human Flesh Search Engine In the absence of a fair and open judicial system, Chinese Netizens have become digital vigilantes. August 11, 2009
 Human Flesh Search Engine Research Blog

Internet vigilantism
Internet in China
Chinese words and phrases
2001 neologisms